Lucas Hammond (born November 14, 1993) is a Canadian rugby union player, in the sevens discipline. Hammond's parents are both Canadians who lived in South Africa, where Hammond was born. They decided to emigrate back to Canada to be closer to family.

Career
Hammond was part of Canada's 2014 Commonwealth Games and 2018 Commonwealth Games, with both teams getting knocked out in the group stage.

Hammond won gold as part of Canada's team at the 2015 Pan American Games in Toronto.

In June 2021, Hammond was named to Canada's 2020 Olympic team.

References

1993 births
Living people
Rugby sevens players at the 2014 Commonwealth Games
Rugby sevens players at the 2018 Commonwealth Games
Commonwealth Games rugby sevens players of Canada
Canada international rugby sevens players
Rugby sevens players at the 2015 Pan American Games
Pan American Games gold medalists for Canada
Medalists at the 2015 Pan American Games
Pan American Games medalists in rugby sevens
Rugby sevens players at the 2020 Summer Olympics
Olympic rugby sevens players of Canada